Oliver Stanisic (born 10 February 1994) is a Swedish football defender who plays for Varbergs BoIS.

References

1994 births
Living people
Swedish footballers
Association football defenders
Torslanda IK players
Qviding FIF players
Varbergs BoIS players
Örgryte IS players
Ettan Fotboll players
Superettan players
Allsvenskan players